Frontier Community College is a community college in Fairfield, Illinois. It confers two-year associate degrees and technical certificates and also offers online four-year degrees through its affiliation with Franklin University. Frontier Community College is one of four colleges in the Illinois Eastern Community Colleges #529 (IECC).

Originally named Illinois Eastern Community Colleges' Continuing Education Facilities in Fairfield, the college opened on September 6, 1974.

History
On July 26, 1976, the concept of "Campus Beyond Walls" was established by the board of trustees for the Continuing Education Division.  The concept was established in order to take education to the people of the 12 counties included in the Illinois Eastern Community Colleges.  Classes were held in churches, schools, community buildings, etc.

The Foundation was formed by community citizens in 1977 and offer financial support with building needs, programs and scholarships.

Presidents of the college include:

Richard L. Mason 1976–1996
Dr. William Lex 1996–2000
Dr. Michael Dreith 2001–2007
Dr. Charles Novak 2007–2008 (Interim)
Dr. Tim Taylor 2008–2014
Dr. Jay Edgren 2014–present

Notable alumni 

 Sarah Frey, farmer and entrepreneur

References
Illinois Eastern Community Colleges Retrieved from http://www.iecc.edu/fcc/history.html

External links
 Official website

Community colleges in Illinois
Education in Wayne County, Illinois
1974 establishments in Illinois
Educational institutions established in 1974